The Play-offs of the 2007 Fed Cup Europe/Africa Zone Group II were the final stages of the Group II Zonal Competition involving teams from Europe and Africa. Using the positions determined in their pools, the seven teams faced off to determine their placing in the 2007 Fed Cup Europe/Africa Zone Group II. The top two teams advanced to Group I, and the bottom two teams were relegated down to the Group III for the next year.

Promotion play-offs
The top two teams of each pool were placed against each other in two head-to-head rounds. The winner of the rounds advanced to Group I for next year.

South Africa vs. Georgia

Greece vs. Portugal

Relegation play-offs
Because there was one extra player in Pool B, the last-placed team of that pool was automatically relegated down to Group III. The third-placed teams of each pool were then placed against each other in a tie, where the losing team would join the Norwegians in relegation.

Finland vs. Bosnia and Herzegovina

Final Placements

  and  advanced to the Europe/Africa Zone Group I for the next year. Both teams came last in their pools and lost their play-offs, however, and thus fell back to Group II for 2009.
The Finns placed third in their pool of six, while the Norwegians placed second in the pool of five.

See also
Fed Cup structure

References

External links
 Fed Cup website

2007 Fed Cup Europe/Africa Zone